"This One's for the Girls" is a song written by Chris Lindsey, Hillary Lindsey, and Aimee Mayo and recorded by American country music singer Martina McBride.  It was released in June 2003 as the first single from McBride’s album Martina. The song peaked at number 3 on the on the US Billboard Hot Country Songs charts and at number 39 on the Billboard Hot 100. The song was also a number 1 single on the Hot Adult Contemporary Tracks charts. 

A remixed version of "This One's for the Girls" was included on her 2008 compilation album Playlist: The Very Best of Martina McBride.

Content
The song's lyrics are a salute to women of various ages (who are "about thirteen," "about twenty-five," and "about forty-two") dealing with the struggles of different phases of life–starting high school and facing new pressures, coping with uncertainty about a career, and reaching middle age–and tells them "You're beautiful the way you are."

McBride's first two daughters, Delaney and Emma, sing backing vocals on the song, as do fellow country singers Carolyn Dawn Johnson and Faith Hill.

Personnel 
The following musicians perform on this track:
 Martina McBride – lead and backing vocals 
 John Hobbs – Hammond B3 organ
 B. James Lowry – acoustic guitar
 Biff Watson – acoustic guitar
 J. T. Corenflos – electric guitar
 Dann Huff – electric guitar
 Dan Dugmore – 12-string guitar, steel guitar
 Jimmie Lee Sloas – bass
 Lonnie Wilson – drums
 David Huff – drum programming
 Faith Hill – backing vocals
 Carolyn Dawn Johnson – backing vocals
 Hillary Lindsey – backing vocals
 Aimee Mayo – backing vocals
 Delaney McBride – backing vocals
 Emma McBride – backing vocals

Chart performance
"This One's for the Girls" debuted at number 49 on the U.S. Billboard Hot Country Singles & Tracks for the week of June 21, 2003.

Weekly charts

Year-end charts

Certifications

References

2003 singles
Martina McBride songs
Songs written by Aimee Mayo
Songs written by Hillary Lindsey
Songs written by Chris Lindsey
Song recordings produced by Paul Worley
RCA Records Nashville singles
Music videos directed by Deaton-Flanigen Productions
2003 songs